is a private university in Kobe, Hyōgo, Japan, established in 2007.

External links

 Official website 

Educational institutions established in 2007
Private universities and colleges in Japan
Universities and colleges in Hyōgo Prefecture
2007 establishments in Japan